Caradrina germainii is a moth of the family Noctuidae. It was described by Philogène Auguste Joseph Duponchel in 1835. It is found in south-western Europe (including Sardinia, Corsica, Sicily and Malta) and North Africa (Morocco, Algeria). It is found mostly in garigue habitats.

Adults have been recorded on wing from June to July and again from September to October. The larvae feed on various low-growing plants.

References

External links

"Caradrina germainii (Duponchel, 1835)". Insecta.pro.
Lepiforum e.V.

Moths described in 1835
Caradrinini
Moths of Europe
Taxa named by Philogène Auguste Joseph Duponchel